Noss Mayo is a village in the civil parish of Newton and Noss in the South Hams district of South West Devon, England, about  south-east of Plymouth. On the opposite, northern bank of the creek is Newton Ferrers, a slightly larger settlement. The two villages were included in the top 20 prettiest towns and villages in Devon in a list compiled by readers of the "Visit Devon" website. The population was 510 in 1991.

The first documentary reference of Noss Mayo was in 1286 as Nesse Matheu. The manor here was held by Matheu son of John from 1284 to 1309.

The village's church, dedicated to Saint Peter, was built in 1880–1882 at the expense of Edward Baring, 1st Baron Revelstoke (head of the family firm of Barings Bank) to a design by James Piers St Aubyn.

References

External links

 Newton Ferrers and Noss Mayo website

 

Villages in South Hams